Peach Springs is a census-designated place (CDP) in Mohave County, Arizona, United States. The population was 1,098 at the 2020 census. Peach Springs serves as the administrative headquarters of the Hualapai people and is located on the Hualapai Reservation.

Geography
Peach Springs is in eastern Mohave County on both sides of Arizona State Route 66 (historic U.S. Route 66).

The community is mainly on the north side of Yampai Canyon, drained by west-flowing Truxton Wash.

Demographics

As of the census of 2000, there were 600 people, 166 households, and 139 families residing in the CDP. The racial makeup of the CDP was 93.0% Native American, 4.3% White,  2.3% from other races, and 0.3% from two or more races.  5.3% of the population were Hispanic or Latino of any race.

There were 166 households, out of which 48.2% had children under the age of 18 living with them, 38.6% were married couples living together, 35.5% had a female householder with no husband present, and 15.7% were non-families. 12.7% of all households were made up of individuals, and 3.6% had someone living alone who was 65 years of age or older.  The average household size was 3.61 and the average family size was 3.83.

In the CDP the population was spread out, with 40.5% under the age of 18, 10.0% from 18 to 24, 25.8% from 25 to 44, 17.3% from 45 to 64, and 6.3% who were 65 years of age or older.  The median age was 24 years. For every 100 females, there were 95.4 males.  For every 100 females age 18 and over, there were 84.0 males.

The median income for a household in the CDP was $18,194, and the median income for a family was $17,292. Males had a median income of $20,833 versus $15,500 for females. The per capita income for the CDP was $6,756.  About 38.2% of families and 36.6% of the population were below the poverty line, including 38.7% of those under age 18 and 55.4% of those age 65 or over.

Arts and culture

The town has the Hualapai Lodge, a motel and a small grocery market with fuel.

Peach Springs is located on the route of the former Atchison, Topeka and Santa Fe Railway (now the BNSF Railway) and on historic US Route 66. Route 66 brought large numbers of cross-country travellers through the town until Interstate 40 was opened  to the south in 1978. I-40 diverges from Route 66 at Seligman  to the east, and the two roads do not meet again until Kingman  to the west. As no connecting roads join the two highways at Peach Springs, the town went from being on the beaten path to being more than thirty miles from the new main road overnight. Peach Springs survived as the administrative base of the Hualapai tribe but suffered irreparable economic damage.

The John Osterman Shell Station, built by a Swedish immigrant in 1929, closed soon after the turn of the millennium. In 2007, the Hualapai Tribe received a $28,000 federal matching grant to rehabilitate the building, which has yet to re-open but which was listed on the National Register of Historic Places in 2012.

Education
It is within the Peach Springs Unified School District.

Valentine Elementary School District has its single K-8 school with a Peach Springs postal address, but the school is physically in Truxton. No part of the Peach Springs CDP is in that district.

See also

References

Census-designated places in Mohave County, Arizona
Hualapai
Seats of government of American Indian reservations
U.S. Route 66 in Arizona